The Jharkhand women's football team is an Indian women's football team representing Jharkhand in the Senior Women's National Football Championship. Their best performance at the Senior Women's National Football Championship was the semi-final appearance at the 2013–14 edition.

Jharkhand's junior team were the runners-up of the National Junior Girls' Football tournament 2019–20 held at Kolhapur while, their sub-junior team were the champions of the National Sub-Junior Girls' Football tournament 2019–20 held in Cuttack.

Honours
 Junior Girl's National Football Championship
 Runners-up (1): 2019–20
 Sub–Junior Girl's National Football Championship
 Winners (1): 2019–20

References

Football in Jharkhand
Women's football teams in India